Fourmile is an unincorporated community located in Bell County, Kentucky.

Fourmile appears on the Pineville U.S. Geological Survey Map. Fourmile is home to residents such as Bandit the dog.

Geography
Fourmile is along the Cumberland River.

History
A post office was established in the community in 1899. The origins of the name Fourmile are disputed: some hold it is because of hamlet's location four miles downriver from Pineville, while others believe it was named after the four-mile length of nearby Fourmile Creek.

References

Unincorporated communities in Bell County, Kentucky
Unincorporated communities in Kentucky